ICAN may refer to:

Organizations
Informed Consent Action Network, a US antivaccine group.
Institute of Chartered Accountants of Namibia
Institute of Chartered Accountants of Nepal
Institute of Chartered Accountants of Nigeria
International Campaign to Abolish Nuclear Weapons
International Children Assistance Network
International Christian Academy of Nagoya, a defunct school in Japan
International Commission for Air Navigation, the predecessor of the International Civil Aviation Organization
Nationalist Canarian Initiative, a former political party in the Canary Islands

Other uses
Icán River, a river in Guatemala
ICAN: Infant, Child, & Adolescent Nutrition, a medical journal 
Interim Capability for Airborne Networking, a system operated by the US Air Force
International Code of Area Nomenclature, a universal naming system for areas of endemism used in biogeography

See also
 I Can (disambiguation)
 Icahn (disambiguation)
 ICANN
 ICAN-II (spacecraft)
 JCAN